Windermere Hotel , originally The Riggs Windermere, is a hotel in Windermere, Cumbria, England, located near Windermere railway station. The hotel opened at the time that the railway link with Kendal was established in 1847. It overlooks the A591 road.

References

Hotels established in 1847
Hotels in Cumbria
Windermere, Cumbria
1847 establishments in England